Imoinu is a 2015 Indian Meitei language film directed by Bijgupta Laishram and produced by Tarunkumar Heisnam, under the banner of Heisnam Brothers Films and presented by Shrabankumar. The film features Gokul Athokpam, Sonia Samjetsabam and Sonia Hijam in the lead roles.  Imoinu was released at Bhagyachandra Open Air Theatre (BOAT), Imphal, on 30 October 2015. The film was also screened at different theatres of Manipur, including Pratap Talkies, Imphal in January 2016, and it was well received by the audiences.

A sequel to the film Imoinu 2 is slated to be released on 20 October 2022.

Plot
Temba has three sons, Achouba, Yaima and Tondonba. Achouba is a noted nat-sankirtan singer. His wife Leimarembi is a dutiful wife, whose manners and discipline impress his father-in-law Temba. Yaima is an engineer and his wife Phajabi is a complete contrast of Leimarembi. Temba’s youngest son Tondonba is a bachelor who is searching for jobs, and is in relationship with Thaballei. Thaballei doesn’t consider their relationship seriously and develops relations with Nongdamba. Bembem, who has just passed matriculation, is not happy with her sister Thaballei’s treatment to Tondonba. Tondonba, on the other hand, begins to fall in love with Bembem for her simple nature. Bembem also starts loving Tondonba. At this time, Thaballei learned that Nongdamba is already married. So, she tries to get close to Tondonba, but when she only realised that Tondonba and Bembem are already in love with each other, she tries her best to reach their destiny.

Cast
 Gokul Athokpam as Tondonba
 Denny Likmabam as Achouba
 Thingom Pritam as Yaima
 Sonia Samjetsabam as Bembem
 Sonia Hijam as Thaballei
 Prameshwori as Phajabi
 Maya Choudhury as Leimarembi
 Takhellambam Lokendra as Ibohal
 R.K. Sanajaoba as Temba
 Sagolsem Dhanamanjuri as Thaballei's Mother
 Philem Puneshori as Bembem's Mother
 Sunil Myboy as Nongdamba

Accolades

Soundtrack
Ranbir Thouna and Sorri Senjam composed the soundtrack for the film and Bijgupta Laishram wrote the lyrics. The songs are titled Kuphet Kaphet Nganba Tandangi and Leisha Mapung Phadringei.

References

2010s Meitei-language films
2015 films